Bimal Patel may refer to:

 Bimal Patel (architect) (born 1961), Indian architect and urban planner.
 Bimal Patel (attorney), American attorney and former assistant secretary of the Treasury Department.
 Bimal N. Patel, Indian legal scholar and university director.